Eldon Hall was the leader of hardware design efforts for the Apollo Guidance Computer (AGC) at MIT, and advocated the use of integrated circuits for this task. He has written extensively of the development of the AGC, culminating in his 1996 book, Journey to the Moon: The History of the Apollo Guidance Computer

He pursued his undergraduate education at the Eastern Nazarene College in Quincy, Massachusetts, his graduate education at Boston University, and his doctoral degree at Harvard University (though he did not complete the PhD).

Publications
Eldon C. Hall (2000). From the Farm to Pioneering with Digital Computers: An Autobiography.
Eldon C. Hall (1996). Journey to the Moon: The History of the Apollo Guidance Computer

References

Year of birth missing (living people)
Living people
Massachusetts Institute of Technology faculty
American computer scientists
American technology writers
Eastern Nazarene College alumni
Harvard University alumni
Boston University alumni